Erik Yakhimovich (born 6 September 1968) is a former Belarusian professional football defender who played for FC Dynamo Moscow in Russia and Vanspor and Gaziantepspor in the Turkish Süper Lig. Yakhimovich retired from professional football in 2003, after a brief stint in China. He currently works for FC Dynamo Moscow as a scout.

Yakhimovich made 34 appearances for the Belarus national football team.

Honours
Dinamo Minsk
Belarusian Premier League champion: 1992, 1992–93, 1993–94
Belarusian Cup champion: 1992, 1993–94

Dynamo Moscow
Russian Cup champion: 1994–95

Career stats

References

External links
 
 
 

1968 births
Living people
Soviet footballers
Belarusian footballers
Belarus international footballers
Belarusian expatriate footballers
Gaziantepspor footballers
Vanspor footballers
Shandong Taishan F.C. players
FC Dinamo Minsk players
FC Dynamo Moscow players
Süper Lig players
Russian Premier League players
Belarusian Premier League players
Association football defenders
Footballers from Minsk
Expatriate footballers in Russia
Expatriate footballers in Turkey
Expatriate footballers in China